"Keep Me in Mind" is a song recorded by American country music group Zac Brown Band. It was released in August 2011 as the fourth single from the Zac Brown Band's second major-label album, 2010's You Get What You Give.  The song was written by lead singer Zac Brown, along with Wyatt Durrette and Nic Cowen.

Composition

In the song, the narrator asks that another woman "keep [him] in mind" should she be dissatisfied with her lover. The song is in the key of F-sharp major, with the guitars in E-flat tuning. During the entire first verse, a two-measure guitar riff is repeated. The chorus follows the pattern B-F-B-F-Dm-B-C-F before the tempo slows on the bridge. During this part of the song, piano and a string section are heard, following the pattern Dm-F-Dm-B-F twice before returning to the original tempo and repeating the chorus.

Critical reception
Billy Dukes of Taste of Country gave the song four and a half stars out of five, calling it "fun" and "funky" while adding that the only negative thing that can be said is that it's "more jam band than straight-up country music." Marc Erickson of Roughstock also described the song "jam-band like" and "great sounding", giving it four stars out of five. Dan Milliken of Country Universe gave the song a B− grade, saying that the song "offers some cool musical changes to pad out its slight theme [but] the band moves through everything so smoothly that that padding also starts to seem slight." He goes on to say that "even when they transition into a Luther Vandross–R&B groove – audacious on paper – they do it with so little drama that you hardly notice it."

Music video
The music video, directed by Fenton Williams, premiered on CMT during their Big New Music Weekend on October 14, 2011. It was filmed during a live performance at Red Rocks Amphitheatre in Denver, Colorado. It shows the group on their tour bus, in concert, and shots of the red rocks. It also uses a live version of the song.

Chart performance
"Keep Me in Mind" debuted at number 59 on the U.S. Billboard Hot Country Songs chart for the week of September 3, 2011.

Weekly charts

Year-end charts

Decade-end charts

Certifications

References

2011 singles
2010 songs
Zac Brown Band songs
Atlantic Records singles
Song recordings produced by Keith Stegall
Bigger Picture Music Group singles
Songs written by Zac Brown
Songs written by Wyatt Durrette (songwriter)